This is a list of champions, or event winners, of the African Championships in Athletics, a biennial athletics competition organized by the Confederation of African Athletics since 1979.

Men

Key:

100 m

200 m

400 m

800 m

1500 m

3000 m

5000 m

10,000 m

Marathon

10,000 metres walk

20 km walk

110 m hurdles

400 m hurdles

3000 m steeplechase

High jump

Pole vault

Long jump

Triple jump

Shot put

Discus throw

Hammer throw

Javelin throw

Decathlon

4 × 100 m relay

4 × 400 m relay

Women

100 m

200 m

400 m

800 m

1500 m

3000 m

5000 m

10,000 m

5000 m walk

10 km walk

20 km walk

100 m hurdles

400 m hurdles

3000 m steeplechase

High jump

Pole vault

Long jump

Triple jump

Shot put

Discus throw

Hammer throw

Javelin throw

Pentathlon

Heptathlon

4 × 100 m relay

4 × 400 m relay

See also
African Championships in Athletics

External links
 Le site de la Confédération Africaine d’Athlétisme

African Athletics Champions
Champions
champ